Grūtas Park (unofficially known as Stalin's World) is a socialist realism museum with a sculpture garden of Soviet-era statues and other Soviet ideological relics from the times of the Lithuanian SSR. The park requires an entrance fee.

History 

After Lithuania restored its independence in 1990, the vast majority of the Soviet statues were taken down and dumped in different places. Malinauskas asked Lithuanian authorities to grant him possession of the sculptures, so that he could build a privately financed museum. This Soviet-theme park was created in the wetlands of the Dzūkija National Park. Many of its features are re-creations of Soviet Gulag prison camps: wooden paths, guard towers, and barbed-wire fences.

Its establishment was controversial and faced considerable opposition at the time. Some ideas originally meant to be a part of the park were never allowed. Examples include transporting the visitors in a Gulag-style train. Grūtas Park and its founder Malinauskas won the 2001 Ig Nobel Peace Prize. Since January 2007 the park has been in dispute with the Lithuanian copyright protection agency. The agency requires royalties to be paid to seven Lithuanian artists who created some of the statues.

The park also contains playgrounds, a mini-zoo and cafes, all containing relics of the Soviet era. On special occasions actors stage re-enactments of various Soviet-sponsored festivals.

Exposition 

The exposition, consisting of 86 statues by 46 different sculptors, is organized into spheres. Each of the statues features a Soviet or socialist activist, many of them ethnic Lithuanians. The Totalitarian Sphere features sculptures of the main Communist leaders and thinkers, including Vladimir Lenin, Joseph Stalin, and Karl Marx. The Terror Sphere is dedicated to sculptures of founders of the Communist Party of Lithuania (Zigmas Aleksa-Angarietis, Vincas Mickevičius-Kapsukas) and officers of the Red Army (Feliksas Baltušis-Žemaitis, Ieronim Uborevich). It also has a sculpture of Felix Dzerzhinsky, the organizer of the Red Terror.

The Soviet Sphere includes sculptures of the four leaders of Lithuanian Communists, executed in the aftermath of the 1926 Lithuanian coup d'état, and activists of the Lithuanian–Soviet War of 1918–1919. The Red Sphere is dedicated to Soviet partisans, including Marytė Melnikaitė. The Occupation and Death Spheres showcase the brutal side the Soviet regime: mass deportations, suppression of the Lithuanian partisans, etc. The 20 hectares of the park area is reminiscent of severe Siberia conditions with its guard towers, fragments of concentration camps and other elements of Soviet repression.

According to The Economist, "As countries grapple with their unsavoury pasts and consider the rightful place of their controversial monuments, the park offers an alternative model to museums or destruction."

See also
Museum of Occupations and Freedom Fights – also known as the "KGB museum" in Vilnius
Memento Park – similar statue park in Budapest, Hungary
Fallen Monument Park – in Moscow
The Chiang Kai-shek Statues in Taiwan
List of statues of Lenin

References

External links
 
 Official site of Grūtas Park

Sculpture gardens, trails and parks in Europe
Museums in Alytus County
2001 establishments in Lithuania
Art museums established in 2001
Art museums and galleries in Lithuania
Druskininkai Municipality
Open-air museums in Lithuania
Monument cemeteries